The Paradigm Shift is the eleventh studio album by American nu metal band Korn. Produced by Don Gilmore, it was released by multiple labels in the United Kingdom on October 7, 2013 and in the United States the next day. It is the first Korn album to feature original guitarist Brian "Head" Welch since 2003's Take a Look in the Mirror.

Background 

Following the year after the release of The Path of Totality, Korn had begun proposing ideas for their next album. James "Munky" Shaffer stated that the album would contain darker elements similar to Issues (1999) mixed with the heaviness of Untouchables (2002). On May 2, 2013, it was revealed that original guitarist Brian "Head" Welch rejoined the band after an eight-year absence and had been recording for the new album. The first single, "Never Never", was officially released on August 12, 2013. The track "Love & Meth" leaked on September 6, 2013 after the band had released several previews. The track "Lullaby for a Sadist" was originally written in 2010 prior to the idea of a dubstep-infused album, but the song did not make the cut for Korn III: Remember Who You Are. "Spike in My Veins" was originally written and recorded with Noisia for inclusion on J Devil's debut album, but ended up being reworked as a Korn song.

Composition 

Regarding the sound, Munky says, "The new music is inspired by our Issues album, or even Untouchables, that era. It’s a little more melodic and a little more aggressive at the same time." Head added in an interview with Rolling Stone that "I'm a metalhead. I love rock music, and I came here just wanting to do the old Korn vibe, but with a new twist. "Me and Munky [James Shaffer] haven't been playing guitar together for eight years, so we came in just wanting to jam out with the bass player Fieldy [Reginald Arvizu] and Ray [Luzier], our drummer. The end product is a really good mix of old Korn mixed with some new elements. It's got a fresh new Korn 2013 sound."

Jonathan Davis described the writing and recording process as "weird". He explains: "They started writing, I think, in August, and I didn't get into the studio until March, because I was going through all kinds of crazy shit. My boy got diabetes and I had come off medication for my depression, and that fucked me up. I was in a straight haze." Davis entered rehab, then returned to writing the album. "It was weird – I moved into the studio. I stayed there for four months, I only came home on weekends. I moved my boys in with me, so I had my kids with me the whole time. It was an interesting creative space." Davis continued, "I don't know how the hell I did it. I was so fucked up from coming off all that medicine, and I feel so good about the record. When I look back now, I'm like, 'Wow, how did I come up with this shit?'"

Album title and packaging 

The album cover, designed by Roboto, features two opposing heads, reminiscent of the Rubin vase illusion.

The title was explained by Munky: 

The standard edition of the album features 11 new tracks, while the deluxe edition contains an additional two tracks and a bonus DVD documenting the return of co-founding guitarist Brian "Head" Welch.

A special edition of the album was released on July 22, 2014 as The Paradigm Shift: World Tour Edition. It contains brand new studio and live recordings. The first new track, "Hater", was released as a single on June 19.

Reception

Critical reception 

The Paradigm Shift has received generally positive reviews. Metacritic scores the album with a rating of 65, indicating "generally favorable reviews".

Max Barrett of Rock Sound wrote the album was "a completely different monster to its predecessor, and for all the right reasons" in his favorable review of album. Kerrang! noted the album as a "more organic effort", and AllMusic stated the album "shows the kind of creativity and inventiveness that ... helped to make them an influential force in heavy music."

In a more mixed review,  stated "Essentially this is Korn returning to their familiar discomfort zone." Popmatters gave the album a mixed review, however stating that the album "may not quite be Korn's best album ever, but The Paradigm Shift is Korn's best album since Untouchables and metal fans could do a lot worse than that".

Commercial performance 
The Paradigm Shift sold 46,000 copies in the United States in its first week of release, and debuted and peaked at No. 8 on the Billboard 200, making it Korn's eleventh studio album to peak in the top ten. The album has sold 174,000 copies as of September 2016 in the US.

Track listing

Personnel 

 Korn
 Jonathan Davis – lead vocals, keyboards, programming
 Brian "Head" Welch – guitars, backing vocals
 James "Munky" Shaffer – guitars, backing vocals
 Reginald "Fieldy" Arvizu – bass
 Ray Luzier – drums

 Other credits
 Don Gilmore – production, mixing
 Nightwatch – production ("Spike in My Veins")
 Jasen Rauch – additional production ("Love & Meth"), engineering, programming
 Mark Kiczula – engineering
 Zaylien – keyboards, programming
 Nick Suddarth – keyboards, programming
 Brad Blackwood – mastering
 Peter Katsis – A&R
 Roboto – cover art
 Sébastien Paquet – film director

Charts

Certifications

References 

Korn albums
Caroline Records albums
2013 albums
Universal Music Group albums